Sarankul is a small town under the district Nayagarh of Odisha.

Cities and towns in Nayagarh district